Sir Ernest Gordon Graham Graham-Little (8 February 1867 – 6 October 1950) was a dermatologist and British Member of Parliament for London University from 1924 to 1950.

Political life
Graham-Little was initially elected as an Independent; from 1931 onwards he gave support to the National Government but did not join any of its component parties. Graham-Little was born in Monghyr, Bengal, India, to Michael and Anna (née English) Little. Following the death of his mother when he was four years old, he was raised in South Africa.  He was the fifth (and last) MP for the London University seat. His first recorded speech supported the lasting introduction of British Summer Time. Graham-Little made 1,596 written questions, answers or debate contributions as recorded by official records. His last contribution was on the subject of National Health Service doctors' basic salary.

References

Bibliography

External links 
 

1867 births
1950 deaths
British dermatologists
Independent members of the House of Commons of the United Kingdom
Members of the Parliament of the United Kingdom for London University
People from Munger district
UK MPs 1924–1929
UK MPs 1929–1931
UK MPs 1931–1935
UK MPs 1935–1945
UK MPs 1945–1950
Presidents of the British Association of Dermatologists
Politicians awarded knighthoods